Lennie Gallant, CM is a Canadian singer-songwriter and instrumentalist from Prince Edward Island. His music crosses into the folk rock and country music genres, while celebrating the musical heritage of his home province.  He has been presented with many awards for his performances and songwriting.

Early life
Gallant was born in Rustico, Prince Edward Island.

His nephews Rowen and Caleb Gallant, the sons of his brother Mark, are also musicians associated with the folk band Ten Strings and a Goat Skin.

Career
Lennie Gallant began at an early age by playing guitar, harmonica and mandolin in local bands. Gallant has released twelve albums (10 in English and 2 in French) of original songs which have won him a host of awards and nominations from the JUNOs, Les Prix Eloizes, and 18 East Coast Music Awards, including 2017 ECMA Entertainer of the Year. His double CD of the 22 songs from his multimedia hit production, Searching For Abegweit, which ran for 140 shows, also won him an ECMA. He was named Canadian Folk Artist of The Year for 2016 and his song Peter’s Dream was voted one of the Top Ten East Coast Songs of All Time.

His album, When We Get There was nominated for a 2007 Juno Award and went into space aboard Space Shuttle Endeavour in July 2009. Canadian astronaut Julie Payette chose the album for the astronaut crew on their 16-day mission.   In a special ceremony, Payette presented  Gallant with his CD, which orbited Earth with her on the International Space Station 250 times.

He performed at the Vancouver Winter Olympic Games, including a performance at BC Place during the medal ceremonies. He represented the East Coast of Canada at "Canada Day in London" in Trafalgar Square on 1 July 2011 in the largest Canada Day celebration outside Canada's borders.

Gallant has toured North America and in Europe with his band in acoustic settings and with symphony orchestras.  He has performed his compositions at songwriter events in Nashville, London, and Texas.  A number of musicians have recorded his songs internationally, including Jimmy Buffett, who recorded Lennie Gallant's song "Mademoiselle Voulez Vous Danser". Artists who have performed his songs include Tara MacLean, Matt Minglewood, Roy Bailey, Sabia, Priscilla Herdman, Delvina Bernard – Four The Moment, and Measha Brueggergosman.

His songs have also appeared in feature films:  Canvas included "Mademoiselle Voulez Vous Danser", recorded by Jimmy Buffett, The theme song for Conquest, a feature in Sigh and a Wish: Helen Creighton's Maritimes and the sound track for The Bellinger  are all Gallant's compositions. His songs have also been used in television series, including Dawson’s Creek ("Northern Lights") and Joan of Arcadia ("Something Unspoken"), and in various theatrical productions.

He also wrote the OXFAM Song, "Land of the Maya", and Halifax's 250th Birthday Theme Song "History is Happening Now", which was then performed with a choir of 2000 voices on one of the two bridges spanning the harbour. He co-wrote, directed and produced the Pier 21 (Canada’s immigration gateway) National Theme Song and the theme song for Acadian World Conference/Congres Mondial Acadien (Acadie de nos coeur).

Gallant played an acting role in an episode of the feature film Emily of New Moon. He wrote the theme song and acted in The Trial of Minnie MacGee and acted in the short film, A Blessing From the Sea.

Lennie Gallant has been involved in numerous charity events, and he recently received the PEI Red Cross Humanitarian of the Year Award for his collaboration with and support of many worthwhile causes. His work with the Mikinduri Children of Hope (for impoverished children in Kenya) is particularly close to his heart, and has raised money through his concerts for this PEI based organization.

Awards and accomplishments

Order of Canada
He was inducted into the Order of Canada where it was said, "Gallant has garnered much respect for his hard hitting songs chronicling the lives of people dealing with tremendous adversity and serious issues. Songs like "Peter's Dream," "Island Clay," "Man of Steel" and "The Hope for Next Year," articulate the feelings of many caught up in desperate situations beyond their control, and at the same time celebrate the beauty of lifestyle and landscape with their strong poetry and stirring narratives." – From the induction ceremony in Ottawa, Canada.

Other awards
Gallant has been presented with 18 East Coast Music Awards, three Juno Nominations, a Canadian Folk Music Award, two Étoiles Awards and an Éloizes Award.

Television
Gallant's television appearances include CTV Morning Live, CBC, CTV Breakfast Television, East Coast Barenaked East Coast Music!, East Coast Music Awards National Broadcasts, The Vicki Gabereau Show, La Fête en Acadie, Brio, Good Morning Canada, Canada AM, @ The End, En Spectacle au Festival Acadien, Gala des prix Éloizes, Gala des prix Étoiles de l'ARCANB, Much More Music/Much Music/CMT, Tout simplement country, Pour l'amour du country and CTV Christmas Daddies.

Discography

Albums

Singles

Music videos

References

External links
 
 

Living people
Canadian country singer-songwriters
Canadian folk singer-songwriters
Canadian male singer-songwriters
Members of the Order of Canada
Musicians from Prince Edward Island
Canadian Folk Music Award winners
Year of birth missing (living people)